William Patterson (1752–1835) was a businessman, a gun-runner during the American Revolution, and a founder of the Baltimore and Ohio Railroad. His many business dealings included shipping, banking, and the Baltimore Water Company.

Early life and career
Patterson was born in 1752 in Fanad, County Donegal, Ireland. He moved to Philadelphia as a penniless fourteen-year-old and set about making his fortune through grim determination and risk-taking. By making connections with older businessmen and merchants, he was able to buy two shares in ships transporting guns from Europe to the Americas. Patterson went along on the voyage. When the ships docked in the West Indies, he left the ship and saw a golden opportunity to roll his money into being a middleman by investing in warehouses where goods were stored before being shipped north to America. He returned to the United States and settled in Baltimore, which at the time was a quickly growing city with many opportunities in trade and business, thanks to its harbor and Mid-Atlantic location. He married into the respectable Spear-Smith family and build a grand townhouse on South Street next to his counting house. Once settled into his business, the risk-taking that had formed his youth mellowed, and he became a cautious, conservative businessman. 

He was a founder of the Baltimore and Ohio Railroad. He was also a founder of the Merchants Exchange, the first president of the Bank of Maryland, and a founder of the Canton Company, a business established in 1828 by Patterson and Peter Cooper, most remembered for inventing and manufacturing the Tom Thumb steam locomotive.

He was reputed to be the second-wealthiest man in Maryland, after Charles Carroll of Carrollton. He was a slave owner who owned several plantations and country estates in the Baltimore area, along with buildings and lots within the city, and branches of his business that reached all the way to the European continent.

Personal life

Patterson was married to Dorcas Spear (1761–1814), a member of the respected Spear-Smith family. Together, they were the parents of thirteen children, including:

 Elizabeth Patterson (1785–1879), who married Jérôme Bonaparte, brother of Napoleon Bonaparte. 
 Robert Patterson (1781–1822), who married Marianne Caton, the maternal granddaughter of Carroll, after Robert's death she married Richard Wellesley, 1st Marquess Wellesley, brother of Arthur Wellesley, 1st Duke of Wellington.
 Edward Patterson (1789–1865), who married Sidney Smith (1794–1879), daughter of Maj. Gen. Samuel Smith.  Edward served in the War of 1812 as aide-de-camp to Isaac McKim and was the maternal grandfather of Sidney Turner Swan Dyer (1858–1933) who married Elisha Dyer III, son and grandson of Rhode Island governors, Elisha Dyer Jr. and Elisha Dyer.

Patterson was known to be a strict father who was very controlling of his children's lives, dictating which sons would go into his business or into a career of his choosing, and he fiercely believed that a woman's role was to be a devoted daughter and wife, in charge of the kitchen and the nursery. This belief alienated his daughter Elizabeth, whose intelligence and ambition were often criticized by her father who could not understand why she wanted to be more than simply a Baltimore wife and mother. He was a philanderer who had many affairs during his marriage, especially with his housekeepers; one of his mistresses was in the house when his wife Dorcas died, and another gave birth to his illegitimate daughter. Throughout his life, his need to control women led to rifts within the family, including alienating both his daughter and his sister-in-law Nancy Spear for their political and social interests. 

Patterson died a millionaire in 1835 in Baltimore, Maryland. In his will, he left the overwhelming majority of his estate to his sons and grandson and used the document as a final way to humiliate his daughter and control his sister-in-law. He wrote, "The conduct of my daughter Betsey has through life been so disobedient that in no instance has she every consulted my opinions or feelings; indeed, she has caused me more anxiety and trouble than all my other children put together, and her folly and misconduct have occasioned me a train of expense that first and last has cost me much money," and left her only a few properties, all of which totaled approximately $10,000--a far cry from the amounts left to his sons. He left an annual allowance to Nancy Spear predicated upon her agreement to never again attend congressional sessions in Washington, D.C. The will was published in the Baltimore Sun, most likely arranged by Patterson before he died. The will violated the prenuptial agreement Elizabeth Patterson and Jerome Bonaparte signed in 1803, in which Patterson would bequeath a share to Elizabeth that was equal to that of his other children. Although Elizabeth Patterson initially contested the will, she ultimately dropped all legal challenges when she learned that her aunt and trusted confidante Nancy Spear sold Elizabeth's letters to her brothers to be used against her in court and in public opinion. The will also freed Patterson's slaves when each reached the age of 30 and left part of his estate to his illegitimate daughter and her mother.

Philanthropy and legacy
In 1827, he donated the first five acres of land that became Baltimore's Patterson Park. The park, its namesake street (Patterson Park Avenue) and a high school to the east of it are named in his honor.

References

External links

1752 births
1835 deaths
American people of Scotch-Irish descent
American railroad executives
American slave owners
Baltimore and Ohio Railroad people
Businesspeople from Baltimore
Kingdom of Ireland emigrants to the Thirteen Colonies
People from County Donegal
Patterson family of Maryland